Liu Zhiming (8 February 1989 – 25 February 2020) was a sprint runner from the People's Republic of China. He ran in the T44 class. In the 2012 Paralympic Games, he won a silver medal as part of the Chinese 4 × 100 m relay team.

References

1989 births
2020 deaths
Paralympic athletes of China
Athletes (track and field) at the 2012 Summer Paralympics
Chinese male sprinters
Medalists at the 2012 Summer Paralympics
Paralympic silver medalists for China
Paralympic medalists in athletics (track and field)